The 1870 Barcelona yellow fever epidemic was an epidemic that took place in the Spanish city of Barcelona in 1870.


History
This yellow fever epidemic was concentrated in the second half of the year 1870, from August to the end of the year. There were a total of 1235 deaths. Half a century earlier, another epidemic of the same disease had taken place, which had killed an estimated 3,251, 6,244, or more than 8,000 people.

References

Sources
 
 

1870 in Spain
Yellow fever
Disease outbreaks in Spain
19th century in Barcelona
19th-century epidemics
1870 health disasters
1870 disasters in Spain